Edward Wright (born 13 October 1977) is a professional sailor from Great Britain and who was nominated for the 2010 ISAF World Sailor of Year Awards.

Career Results Highlights
 3rd - 2014 ISAF Sailing World Championships in the Finn
 2nd - 2013 Finn World Championship
 2nd - 2012 Finn World Championship
 3rd - 2011 ISAF Sailing World Championships in the Finn
 1st - 2010 Finn World Championship
 3rd - 2006 Finn World Championship
 6th - 2002 Laser World Championship

References

External links
 
 

1977 births
Living people
English male sailors (sport)
Sportspeople from Nottingham
Green Comm Racing sailors
Finn class world champions
World champions in sailing for Great Britain